Yakov Federovich Shkinsky (4 June 1858 – 22 April 1938) was an Imperial Russian division and corps commander. He fought in the wars against the Ottoman Empire and the Empire of Japan. After the October Revolution, he fought against the Bolsheviks and after the end of the subsequent civil war, he emigrated to Yugoslavia.

Awards
Order of Saint Anna, 4th class, 1878
Order of Saint Stanislaus (House of Romanov), 3rd class, 1878
Order of Saint Anna, 3rd class, 1884
Order of Saint Stanislaus (House of Romanov), 2nd class, 1888
Order of Saint Anna, 2nd class, 1891
Order of Saint Vladimir, 4th class, 1895
Order of Saint Vladimir, 3rd class, 1898
Order of Saint Stanislaus (House of Romanov), 1st class, 1903
Order of Saint Anna, 1st class, 1909
Order of Saint Vladimir, 2nd class (December 6, 1914)
Order of the White Eagle (Russian Empire), 1915
Order of Saint Alexander Nevsky (April 10, 1916)

Sources
Волков С.В. Офицеры российской гвардии, М., 2002
Высочайшие приказы о чинах военных, 04.1914
Незабытые могилы, т. 6, кн. 3

1858 births
1938 deaths
Russian military personnel of the Russo-Turkish War (1877–1878)
Russian military personnel of the Russo-Japanese War
Russian military personnel of World War I
People of the Russian Civil War
Recipients of the Order of St. Anna, 4th class
Recipients of the Order of Saint Stanislaus (Russian), 3rd class
Recipients of the Order of St. Anna, 3rd class
Recipients of the Order of Saint Stanislaus (Russian), 2nd class
Recipients of the Order of St. Anna, 2nd class
Recipients of the Order of St. Vladimir, 4th class
Recipients of the Order of St. Vladimir, 3rd class
Recipients of the Order of Saint Stanislaus (Russian), 1st class
Recipients of the Order of St. Anna, 1st class
Recipients of the Order of St. Vladimir, 2nd class
Recipients of the Order of the White Eagle (Russia)